The Russell may refer to:

The Russell (Worcester, Massachusetts), listed on the National Register of Historic Places
The Russell (Detroit, Michigan)

See also
Russell House (disambiguation)